"3 Boys" is a song by American singer-songwriter Omar Apollo. It was released on 16 February 2023 through Warner Records.
It lyrically speaks of the protagonist accepting his partner's suggestion of a ménage à trois only to find out it will not work out, describing polyamory as resentments waiting to happen.

Background 
"3 Boys" was Apollo's first song of 2023 after releasing his debut studio album, Ivory, a year prior.
A week before the song's release, Apollo posted a snippet of the song on his social media with the cover and the title.
He explains, 'When I first started writing songs I would often write about unrequited love. "3 Boys" was my first time writing about something non-monogamous. I wrote the song on a rainy day in London...with a friend of mine, Dylan Wiggins. I also had my friend Mustafa help me with a few lines after I played it for him.'

Critical reception 
Jon Blistein of Rolling Stone wrote, 'the real draw is Apollo's vocals and his torn-up lyrics, Three boys would work if I wasn't so tethered to you Uproxx simply described it as 'a smooth, hypnotic beat' while specifying the chorus. BroadwayWorld stated, 'The simple, romantic melody is weaved with complex vocals that give every verse a different feel while staying true to his sound.' Fault Magazine referred to the song as 'A reflection of the artist's growth and authenticity.'

Charts

References

External links 
 

2023 songs
2023 singles
LGBT-related songs
Omar Apollo songs
Songs about infidelity